Hoseynabad-e Gusheh (also Romanized as Ḩoseynābād-e Gūsheh) is a village in Miyan Velayat Rural District, in the Central District of Mashhad County, Razavi Khorasan Province, Iran. At the 2006 census, its population was 87, in 20 families.

References 

Populated places in Mashhad County